Ambrosius or Ambrosios (a Latin adjective derived from the Ancient Greek word ἀμβρόσιος, ambrosios "divine, immortal") may refer to:

Given name:
Ambrosius Alexandrinus, a Latinization of the name of Ambrose of Alexandria (before 212–c. 250), Egyptian theologian and saint
Saint Ambrose (Aurelius Ambrosius) (c. 340–397), bishop of Milan
Ambrosius Aurelianus, fifth-century war leader of the Romano-British
Ambrosius of Georgia (1861–1927), Catholicos Patriarch of All Georgia
Ambrosius of Optino
Ambrosius, Metropolitan of Helsinki
Ambrosius, Metropolitan of Moscow
Ambrosius (Hussite), priest, leader of Hussite peasants
Ambrosius Beber (fl. 1610–1620), German composer
Ambrosius Benson (c. 1495/1500 – 1550), Italian painter
Ambrosius Blarer (1492–1564), Swiss reformer
Ambrosius Bosschaert (1573–1621), Dutch painter
Ambrosius Bosschaert II (1609–1645), Dutch painter, son of the above
Ambrosius Bogbinder, mayor of Copenhagen (1529–36)
Ambrosius Brueghel (1617–1675), Flemish Baroque painter
Ambrosius Ehinger (c. 1500 – 1533), German conquistador
Ambrosius Gudko (1867–1918), Russian Orthodox saint and bishop
Ambrosius Francken I (1544–1618), Flemish Baroque painter
Ambrosius Francken II (1590–1632), Flemish painter, nephew of the above
Ambrosius Frobenius (1537–1602), Swiss printer and publisher
Ambrosius Haingura (1957–2000), Namibian activist and politician
Ambrosius Holbein (c. 1494 – c. 1519), German and Swiss painter, drawer and printmaker, elder brother of Hans Holbein the Younger
Ambrosius Hubrecht (1853–1915), Dutch zoologist
Ambrosius Lobwasser (1515–1585), German humanist and translator
Macrobius (fl. 5th century), Roman grammarian and philosopher (Ambrosius Theodosius Macrobius in later manuscripts)
Ambrosius Moibanus (1494–1554), German Lutheran theologian and reformer
Ambrosius Pelargus (c. 1493 – 1561), German anti-reformer Dominican theologian
Ambrosius Petruzzy (died 1652), Italian sculptor
Ambrosios Pleianthidis, Greek Orthodox metropolitan bishop
Ambrosius Stub (1705–1758), Danish poet

Surname:
Marsha Ambrosius (born 1977), English singer-songwriter

Fictional characters:
Merlin, in Arthurian legend, named Merlin Ambrosius in Godfrey of Monmouth's  Historia Regum Britanniae
Ambrosius, a character in the film Labyrinth

See also
Ambrose (given name)
Ambrose (surname)